Pseudodeltote subcoenia is a species of moth of the family Noctuidae first described by Alfred Ernest Wileman and Richard South in 1916. It is found in Taiwan and Godawari, Nepal.

The length of the forewings is 9–12 mm. The forewings are ochreous white, suffused with olive brown and white and the hindwings are white sprinkled with dark brown.

References

Eustrotiinae
Moths described in 1916